Abigail Susan Elisabeth Edmonds (born 26 September 1990 in Watford) is a British canoeist that was chosen to represent Great Britain at the London 2012 Olympics. She competed in the K-2 500 m with Louisa Sawers-Gurski, finishing in 11th place.

References

External links
 
 

1990 births
Living people
Sportspeople from Watford
British female canoeists
Olympic canoeists of Great Britain
Canoeists at the 2012 Summer Olympics